RFA Fort George was a combined fleet stores ship and tanker of the Royal Fleet Auxiliary, and one of two s.

Fort George was ordered from Swan Hunter in late 1987. The ship was laid down in 1989, launched by the wife of the Commander-in-Chief Fleet Admiral Sir Jock Slater in 1991 and commissioned in 1993. Along with RFA Fort Victoria, the ship was equipped with two Phalanx CIWS point defence guns during a refit at Tyne in 1999.

Operational history
In March 2000, the ship was equipped with five Westland Sea King helicopters and sent to Mozambique to help with disaster relief work following devastating floods. In May she accompanied the aircraft carrier  to Sierra Leone to support British operations to restore stability to that country. Late in the year, during a deployment in the Mediterranean, the ship helped passengers of the Greek ferry Express Samina which had run aground and sunk during a storm on 26 September.

In September 2009, Fort George, whilst working with the Type 23 frigate , was involved in the largest ever drugs seizure to date by the Royal Navy, when 5.5 tonnes of cocaine were seized from a converted fishing vessel MV Cristal in the Atlantic Ocean off South America.

Disposal
Under the Strategic Defence and Security Review of 2010, the ship was identified for withdrawal. From March 2011 she was being stripped of stores and fittings in Liverpool, where she remained for two years. She left Liverpool on 16 January 2013 under tow destined for a Turkish ship breakers. Her sister ship, remains in service as of 2023.

References

Fort Victoria-class replenishment oilers
1991 ships
Ships built by Swan Hunter
Ships built on the River Tyne